Coleophora intexta is a moth of the family Coleophoridae. It is found in Peru.

References

intexta
Moths described in 1917
Moths of South America